Carsten Brodesser (born 5 September 1967) is a German economist and politician of the Christian Democratic Union (CDU) who has been serving as a member of the Bundestag from the state of North Rhine-Westphalia since 2017.

Political career 
Brodesser became a member of the Bundestag in the 2017 German federal election, representing the Oberbergischer Kreis district. He is a member of the Finance Committee.

Other activities 
 Nuclear Waste Disposal Fund (KENFO), Alternate Member of the Board of Trustees (since 2022)
 Deutsche Renten Information (DRI), Member of the Advisory Board

References

External links 

  
 Bundestag biography 

1967 births
Living people
Members of the Bundestag for North Rhine-Westphalia
Members of the Bundestag 2017–2021
Members of the Bundestag 2021–2025
Members of the Bundestag for the Christian Democratic Union of Germany